The 1965 Delaware Fightin' Blue Hens football team was an American football team that represented the University of Delaware in the Middle Atlantic Conference during the 1965 NCAA College Division football season. In its 15th and final season under head coach David M. Nelson, the team compiled a 5–4 record (3–3 against MAC opponents) and outscored opponents by a total of 213 to 152. James Mueller was the team captain. The team played its home games at Delaware Stadium in Newark, Delaware.

Schedule

References

Delaware
Delaware Fightin' Blue Hens football seasons
Delaware Fightin' Blue Hens football